Seabridge is a suburb of Newcastle-under-Lyme in Staffordshire, England.

The origin of the name "Seabridge" is unknown as it is situated in the midlands, far away from any major water source.

A place spelt as 'Shebrugge' is mentioned in 1403, in a legal record where the county margination is Staffordshire

References

Newcastle-under-Lyme